Cornwall is a rural locality in the local government area (LGA) of Break O'Day in the North-east LGA region of Tasmania. The 2016 census recorded a population of 65 for the state suburb of Cornwall.

History 
Cornwall was gazetted as a locality in 1973. 

It was named by Governor King in 1804, after Cornwall in Britain, which never mined coal, it was a tin mining area.

Geography
Cornwall is completely surrounded by the locality of St Marys.

Road infrastructure 
Route A4 (Esk Main Road) passes to the south of the locality, from where Cornwall Road provides access.

References

Towns in Tasmania
Localities of Break O'Day Council